Artistic swimming competitions at the 2022 South American Games in Asuncion, Paraguay are scheduled to be held between October 7 and 9, 2022 at the Centro Acuático Nacional.

A women's team and duet competition was contested. A total of seven NOC's entered teams into one or both competitions. The top two teams in each event qualified for the 2023 Pan American Games Artistic swimming competitions (duet and team), along with the host nation Chile. The two best countries in the duet not qualified in the team event also qualifying their pair for the games.

Medal summary

Medal table

Medalists

References

Artistic swimming
South American Games
2022
Qualification tournaments for the 2023 Pan American Games
Swimming competitions in Paraguay
Artistic swimming at the 2022 South American Games